Thomas Stangassinger (born 15 September 1965) is an Austrian former alpine skier.

Career
Throughout the 1990s, he belonged to the international slalom elite. He won a silver medal in the World Ski Championships in Saalbach-Hinterglemm and a bronze medal in the World Ski Championships in Morioka. His career highlight came when he won the slalom competition at the 1994 Olympics in Lillehammer.

World Cup victories

References

External links
 
 

1965 births
Austrian male alpine skiers
Living people
Alpine skiers at the 1988 Winter Olympics
Alpine skiers at the 1992 Winter Olympics
Alpine skiers at the 1994 Winter Olympics
Alpine skiers at the 1998 Winter Olympics
Olympic gold medalists for Austria
Olympic medalists in alpine skiing
FIS Alpine Ski World Cup champions
Medalists at the 1994 Winter Olympics
Olympic alpine skiers of Austria
People from Hallein
Sportspeople from Salzburg (state)